Stamford is a city on the border of Jones and Haskell Counties in west-central Texas. The population was 3,124 at the 2010 census, down from 3,636 at the 2000 census. Henry McHarg, president of the Texas Central Railroad, named the site in 1900 for his hometown of Stamford, Connecticut. The city is home to the Texas Cowboy Reunion.

Stamford is on U.S. Highway 277 and State Highway 6. Most of the city is in Jones County. The portion of the city within Jones County is part of the Abilene, Texas metropolitan area.

History
While the town was named by Henry King McHarg for Stamford, Connecticut, the townsite was donated by the family of Swante Magnus Swenson. Mr. Swenson was the first Swedish immigrant to Texas. He became one of the largest landowners in Texas, and by 1860, his holdings in West Texas approached . These ranches, which spread across 12 Texas counties, became known as the SMS Ranches. Later reorganized as the Swenson Land and Cattle Company, it is headquartered in Stamford to this day. Mr. Swenson had two sons, Eric Pierson and Swen Albin, who became known as the Swenson brothers. They ran SMS Ranches, and even developed a Morab horse-breeding program near the city.

Swante M. Swenson is largely responsible for initiating and supporting Swedish immigration to Texas, starting in 1847. Mr. Swenson assisted Swedish immigrants with the cost of their passage from Sweden to Texas in exchange for their labor. In 1899, the Swenson brothers persuaded Henry McHarg, president of the Texas Central Railroad, to extend the railroad through their land. The town and surrounding area were then partially settled by immigrants from Sweden. Many of the cotton farmers who moved to the area bought tracts of land from the Swenson brothers. Stamford's main street is named Swenson.

In 1900, the railroad arrived in Stamford, when the independent Texas Central Railway completed its  line from Albany to the town. In 1906–7, the Texas Central built another line, connecting Stamford with Rotan. By 1908, Stamford was connected to points north and east, through a line of the Wichita Valley Railroad running south from Seymour and commissioned expressly for this purpose.

Stamford College was founded as Stamford Collegiate Institute in September 1907 by the Northwest Texas Methodist Conference. Drought and World War I caused declining enrollments, and the college was closed in 1918 after a fire. The president of Stamford College went on to found McMurry University in Abilene.

In 1930, the Swensons were largely responsible for the founding of the annual Texas Cowboy Reunion.

The city's general-aviation airport, Arledge Field, began operation in April 1941 as an Army Air Corps training center during World War II.

For the city's first half century, order was kept by police chief George G. Flournoy. A small, crippled, cigar-chewing man, Flournoy began each day's work with target shooting at a stump outside city hall.

In 1967, the rail line which connected Stamford to Albany and Waco was abandoned by the Missouri, Kansas & Texas Railway, which had leased the Texas Central since 1914. Though the line from Stamford to Rotan was reacquired by the Texas Central Railway, it was sold three years later to the Fort Worth & Denver Railway Company, and subsequently abandoned.

Geography

Stamford is located in west-central Texas, and is part of the American Southwest. The city is also part of the physical region in West Texas known as the Rolling Plains.

Lake Stamford
The lake was created in 1953 by the impoundment of Paint Creek in Haskell County. Lake Stamford serves as the municipal water source for Stamford, as well as several neighboring communities and rural water suppliers. The lake also provides recreational fishing and boating.

Climate

Stamford has a semiarid climate, according to the Köppen climate classification. Record snowfall of  occurred on two separate dates: November 25, 2007, and April 6, 1996. In September 1900, months after Stamford was formed, the 1900 Galveston hurricane caused flooding in the city and reportedly killed 10 people. Because of its position at the southern edge of Tornado Alley, Stamford is susceptible to supercell thunderstorms, which produce large hail and can produce tornadoes.

Rainfall and drought

Demographics

2000 Census
As of the census of 2000,  3,636 people, 1,402 households, and 971 families resided in the city. The population density was 610.2 people per square mile (235.5/km2). The 1,713 housing units averaged 287.5/sq mi (111.0/km2). The racial makeup of the city was 74.01% White, 7.92% African American, 1.38% Native American, 0.11% Asian, 14.80% from other races, and 1.79% from two or more races. Hispanics or Latinos of any race were 26.93% of the population.

Of the 1,402 households, 34.2% had children under the age of 18 living with them, 51.3% were married couples living together, 13.5% had a female householder with no husband present, and 30.7% were not families. About 28.3% of all households were made up of individuals, and 17.6% had someone living alone who was 65 years of age or older. The average household size was 2.48 and the average family size was 3.03.

In the city, the population was distributed as 27.6% under the age of 18, 6.2% from 18 to 24, 23.5% from 25 to 44, 21.0% from 45 to 64, and 21.6% who were 65 years of age or older. The median age was 40 years. For every 100 females, there were 88.8 males. For every 100 females age 18 and over, there were 80.2 males.

The median income for a household in the city was $24,079, and for a family was $28,438. Males had a median income of $22,453 versus $16,786 for females. The per capita income for the city was $14,028. About 22.0% of families and 24.7% of the population were below the poverty line, including 37.2% of those under age 18 and 21.0% of those age 65 or over.

2010 Census
As of the census of 2010, there were 3,124 people, 1,254 households, and 802 families residing in the city. The 1,638 housing units averaged . The racial makeup of the city was 77.1% White, 8.5% African American, 0.8% Native American, 0.3% Asian, 10.1% from other races, and 3.0% from two or more races. Hispanics or Latinos of any race were 32.4% of the population.

Of the 1,254 households, 25.6% had children under the age of 18 living with them, 44.1% were married couples living together, 14.5% had a female householder with no husband present, and 36.0% were not families. About 31.3% of all households were made up of individuals, and 16.1% had someone living alone who was 65 years of age or older. The average household size was 2.39 and the average family size was 3.01.
In the city, the population was distributed as 24.3% under the age of 18, 6.7% from 18 to 24, 19.5% from 25 to 44, 28.4% from 45 to 64, and 21.1% who were 65 years of age or older. The median age was 44.5 years. For every 100 females, there were 90.9 males. For every 100 females age 18 and over, there were 85.5 males.

The median income for a household in the city was $32,441, and for a family was $40,801. The per capita income for the city was $18,971. About 14.6% of families and 29.5% of the population were below the poverty line, including 41.9% of those under age 18 and 13.6% of those age 65 or over.

2020 census

As of the 2020 United States census, there were 2,907 people, 1,276 households, and 852 families residing in the city.

Education

The city is served by the Stamford Independent School District and is home to the Stamford High School Bulldogs.

Public library
Of the 32 original Carnegie libraries built in Texas, Stamford Carnegie Library is one of only four that remain as libraries, and one of 13 that survive.

Texas Cowboy Reunion 
The first annual Texas Cowboy Reunion was held on June 28, 1930. It was established as a tribute to Texas cowboys, to preserve their traditions, and to lift the Depression-era morale. The first year was a success, as over 12,000 attendees watched three days of calf roping, bronco riding, steer riding, and the rodeo's first exhibition of wild-cow milking. The Old Timers' Association, a group composed of retired cowboys, was formed for historical commemoration.

Will Rogers made one of his last public appearances at the Texas Cowboy Reunion in 1935, less than two months before he died. In 1937, when rural West Texas was at its most populous, a record 70,000 visitors made their way to the event. Wild-cow milking was not Stamford's only contribution to modern rodeo events. Subsequent years had the creation of double mugging, a staple of Texas rodeos and ranch rodeo competitions. The worldwide phenomenon of barrel racing was modernized in Stamford, where the now-ubiquitous cloverleaf pattern was first used. In 1940, the American Quarter Horse Association held its first show at the Texas Cowboy Reunion. With a contestant roster made up primarily of working cowboys and regular folks, the event came to be billed as the "world's largest amateur rodeo". In the 1948 United States Senate election in Texas, candidate Coke Stevenson participated in the event and rode down the street on horseback, which won him many cheers.

Today, the event is held for four days each year around July 4 at the Texas Cowboy Reunion Grounds in Stamford. Annual events include a grand parade, four rodeo performances, a matched horse race, ropings, chuckwagon and barbecue cookoffs, daily barbecue meals, a Western art show and sale, fiddling and poetry performances, and dances.

Culture

Elvis Presley
Elvis Presley performed at the Roundup Hall on the Texas Cowboy Reunion grounds on Friday, April 15, 1955. Earlier that evening, Elvis performed a stage show at the Stamford High School auditorium. Just over two months later, Elvis performed at the Roundup Hall on Friday, June 17, 1955.

Museum
The Museum of the West Texas Frontier celebrates the area's ranching heritage by showcasing original paintings and prints by noted cowboy artists, farm and ranch artifacts from the early 20th century, antique furnishings, period clothing, and a chuck wagon.

Economy

The economy of Stamford is based largely on education, healthcare, and agriculture.

Many thousands of acres of arable farmland surround the city, the majority of which is used to cultivate upland cotton. A cotton gin is in Stamford, and several more are within  of the city. Other businesses include a cotton delinting plant, cotton compress, cottonseed oil mill, clothing factory, and grain elevator.

Health care
Stamford Memorial Hospital is a 25-bed, acute-care hospital and health clinic. The hospital was originally established in 1910 as Stamford Sanitarium, and was the only hospital in the area until 1924, with the construction of Hendrick Hospital in Abilene.

Media

Newspapers
Stamford has two weekly newspapers:
The Stamford American
The Stamford Star

Radio
 KVRP (AM) 1400 AM "The River" (Christian Contemporary)
 KLGD 106.9 FM "The Country Giant" (Classic Country)

Major highways
 US 277
 SH 6
 SH 92
 SH 283

Notable people

 Noel Brown, mid-20th century tennis player, was born in Stamford
 Pete Cole, former American football player, was born in Stamford
 Mike Compton, former MLB player for the 1970 Philadelphia Phillies, was born in Stamford and now works as a minor league manager and catching coordinator
 Charles Coody, the professional golfer who beat Jack Nicklaus to win the Masters in 1971, was born in Stamford
 Norm Cox, former American football player, was born in Stamford
 Frank Shelby Groner, former pastor of First Baptist Church in Stamford, later became president of the College of Marshall
 Bob Harrison, former defensive lineman in the National Football League for the San Francisco 49ers, Philadelphia Eagles, and the Pittsburgh Steelers, was born and resided in Stamford until his death in 2016
 William C. Holden, first director of the Museum of Texas Tech University, graduated from Stamford Junior College in 1914
 Jeannie C. Riley, singer of 1968 country and pop hit "Harper Valley PTA", was born in Stamford
 James Washington, NFL wide receiver for the Dallas Cowboys, and formerly the Pittsburgh Steelers and OSU Cowboys, grew up in Stamford
 John V. Roach, a business executive and an early proponent of the personal computer, was born in Stamford
 Robert S. Strauss, last United States Ambassador to the Soviet Union and first Ambassador to Russia, Special Envoy for the Middle East under President Carter, United States Trade Representative, Chairman of the Democratic National Committee, and co-founder of the global law firm Akin Gump Strauss Hauer & Feld, was raised in Stamford
 Charles Stenholm, former congressman elected to 13 terms for Texas's 17th congressional district, was born in Stamford and resides in the area
 Joe S. Vásquez, currently the bishop for the Diocese of Austin, was born in Stamford

See also

 National Register of Historic Places listings in Jones County, Texas
 List of museums in West Texas
 Lake Stamford

References

External links

Swenson Land & Cattle Company 
Texas Cowboy Reunion

Cities in Texas
Cities in Jones County, Texas
Cities in Haskell County, Texas
Cities in the Abilene metropolitan area

Populated places established in 1900
1900 establishments in Texas